Harry Royston was a British stage and film actor. He appeared in more than sixty short and feature films during the silent era including Lady Jennifer.

Selected filmography
 Oliver Twist (1912)
 Adrift on Life's Tide (1913)
The Vicar of Wakefield (1913)
Shadows of a Great City (1913)
Justice (1914)
Barnaby Rudge (1915)
Lady Jennifer (1915)
 Diana and Destiny (1916)
 A Dead Certainty (1920)

References

Bibliography
 Goble, Alan. The Complete Index to Literary Sources in Film. Walter de Gruyter, 1999.

External links

1894 births
1942 deaths
English male film actors
English male silent film actors
20th-century English male actors
English male stage actors
Male actors from Bradford